Paulie Koch (born October 12, 1996) is an American world champion wakeboarder.  In 2010 he rose to the top of the wakeboarding world when won the Under 13 Boys 2010 Rockstar WWA Wakeboard World Championships at the age of 13.  Paulie started wakeboarding at the age of 5.  That same year he started competing in local INT events.  Paulie went on to become the 2004 New England Regional Champion and was invited to represent New England at the 2004 INT National Championships.  That year he won his first major title, "2004 Mini Outlaw INT National Champion".

On August 6, 2010, at the age of 13, Wakeboarding magazine's website, www.wakeboardingmag.com, ran a news article called "Future Pro Paulie Koch shreds the projects".  A few weeks later Paulie was crowned the 2010 WWA wakeboard world champion in the Boys 13 & Under age group.

Featured on TV 
Starting in 2010 The Koch kids can now be seen daily wakeboarding on the Disney Channel in Disney’s sports “shorts” called “Getcha Head In The Game”.  Paulie Koch and his sisters, Tori, Gabriella and Moxie, were selected to be featured for the next five years in a Disney short film that showcases their Wakeboarding skills and training regimen.   The Koch kids signed a contract allowing Disney to air the segment throughout the World.

Disney developed the sports series “Getcha Head In The Game” to search out young athletes and film them practicing and training to capture their passion for their individual sports. The concept behind the programming is that kids can inspire other kids to become active and try new sports.  If all kids can “get their heads into a sport that they love”, then their skill level and physical fitness will follow. Paulie has been training with his sister Tori since he was 3 years old and both have achieved the highest levels of excellence in the sport of Wakeboarding. They are an inspiration to younger siblings, Gabriella and Moxie and now that Disney will be featuring them, millions more kids will see their training regimen and be exposed to the thrilling sport of Wakeboarding.

Sponsors 
Paulie has had sponsors asking him to ride for them since he was 8 years old.  He has stayed loyal to Body Glove and Liquid Force and has now been riding for them for over 5 years.  Paulie's sponsors now include:
Fox Racing
Nautique
Liquid Force
Body Glove
Go Pro Cameras

Wakeboarding Achievements 
2010 WWA Wakeboarding World Champion (Boys 13 & Under)
2010 USA Wakeboarding National Champion (Boys 13 & Under)
2010 WWA Wakeboarding National Championship Best trick award (Best Amateur Trick)
2010 WWA Wakeboarding Nationals 3rd Place (Boys 13 & Under)
2010 New Jersey Wakeoff Outlaw Champion
2010 Board Up Miami 2nd place
2009 New England Fresh Water Marine Wakefest Wakeboarding Outlaw Champion
2008 New Jersey Wakeoff Expert Champion
2004 INT Wakeboarding National Champion

References

External links 
PaulieKoch.com
http://wakeboardingmag.com/videos/2010/08/06/video-future-pro-paulie-koch-shreds-the-projects/
http://www.greenwichtime.com/local/article/Old-Greenwich-s-Koch-siblings-taking-wakeboarding-612617.php
http://wakeboardingmag.com/videos/2010/06/22/video-wakeboarding-segment-on-disney-channel/
http://www.torikochwake.com/torikochwake.com/Home.html

American wakeboarders
Living people
1996 births
People from Old Greenwich, Connecticut